The Forgiven, Not Forgotten World Tour is the debut concert tour by the Irish band The Corrs. The tour promotes the group's debut album, Forgiven, Not Forgotten. It began April 1996 in Ireland and concluded in Australia in February 1997. The group performed as Celine Dion's opening act during her 1996–97 tour; performing in arenas and amphitheaters across North America and Europe.

Setlist
The following setlist is taken from the concert held on 11 July 1996 at Club Quattro Shibuya in Tokyo, Japan. It does not represent all concerts during the tour.
"Erin Shore" (Instrumental Sequence)
"Forgiven, Not Forgotten"
"Heaven Knows"
"Leave Me Alone"
"The Right Time"
"Joy of Life"
"Closer"
"Runaway"
"Along with the Girls"
"Haste to the Wedding"
"Secret Life"
"On Your Own"
"Someday"
"(Lough) Erin Shore"
Encore:
"Love to Love You"
"Toss the Feathers"

Notes
A cover of Sister Sledge's  We Are Family was performed on selected dates throughout the tour.
Little Wing was added to the setlist in December of 1996.

Tour dates

Festivals and other miscellaneous performances
Bantry Mussel Fair
Midtfyns Festival
Fleadh Music Festival
Storsjöyran
Langelandsfestivalen
Folk Dranouter
Millstreet Music Fair
Festival Interceltique de Lorient
Rose of Tralee

Personnel

Band
Andrea Corr (lead vocals, tin whistle)
Sharon Corr (violin, keyboards, vocals)
Caroline Corr (drums, bodhran, vocals)
Jim Corr (guitar, keyboards, vocals)
Keith Duffy (bass)
Anto Drennan (lead guitar)

Management and agents
John Hughes (manager)
Emma Hill (management assistant)
John Giddings at Solo ITG (international agent)
Barry Gaster (Irish agent)
Paul Gaster (agents representative)

The crew
Henry McGroggan (tour manager)
Aiden Lee (production manager)
Liam McCarthy (lighting designer)
Max Bisgrove (sound engineer)
Paul 'Mini' Moore (monitor engineer)
Declan Hogan (drum technician)
John Parsons (guitar technician)
Oisin Murray (midi technician)

References

The Corrs concert tours
1996 concert tours
1997 concert tours